Kaolin Creek is a stream in northern Iron County in the U.S. state of Missouri. It is a tributary of Ottery Creek.

Kaolin Creek was named for deposits of kaolin in the area.

See also
List of rivers of Missouri

References

Rivers of Iron County, Missouri
Rivers of Missouri